A language code is a code that assigns letters or numbers as identifiers or classifiers for languages.  These codes may be used to organize library collections or presentations of data, to choose the correct localizations and translations in computing, and as a shorthand designation for longer forms of language names.

Difficulties of classification 
Language code schemes attempt to classify the complex world of human languages, dialects, and variants. Most schemes make some compromises between being general and being complete enough to support specific dialects.

For example, most people in Central America and South America speak Spanish.  Spanish spoken in Mexico will be slightly different from Spanish spoken in Peru.  Different regions of Mexico will have slightly different dialects and accents of Spanish.  A language code scheme might group these all as "Spanish" for choosing a keyboard layout, most as "Spanish" for general usage, or separate each dialect to allow region-specific idioms.

Common schemes 

Some common language code schemes include:

See also 
 Accept-Language
 Codes for constructed languages
 Country code
 Flag icons for languages
 List of ISO 639-1 codes -  codes for common languages
 List of ISO 639-2 codes - expanded 3 character code list of all languages coded by ISO
 Locale (computer software)

References

External links 
 List of usual language codes and its variants
 Language Tags in HTML and XML
 Language Identifiers in the Markup Context

 
Identifiers
Internationalization and localization